Blaine Boekhorst (born 2 September 1993) is a former professional Australian rules footballer who played for the Carlton Football Club in the Australian Football League (AFL).

Boekhorst was raised in Port Hedland, in northern Western Australia. His mother was born in India, while his father is a third-generation Australian of Dutch descent. Boekhorst played his colts football for Swan Districts in the West Australian Football League. He progressed through the minor grades to the seniors at Swan Districts, and cemented a regular senior place in the team in 2014. Boekhorst played a total of 44 games for Swans between 2011 and 2014.

He made his senior debut against  in Round 4 of the 2015 season.

After the end of the 2017 season, Carlton informed Boekhorst he would not be offered a new contract with the club.

Statistics
Statistics are correct to the end of 2017 Season.

|-
|- style="background-color: #EAEAEA"
! scope="row" style="text-align:center" | 2015
|style="text-align:center;"|
| 12 || 11 || 5 || 9 || 76 || 62 || 138 || 24 || 26 || 0.45 || 0.82 || 6.91 || 5.64 || 12.55 || 2.18 || 2.36
|-
! scope="row" style="text-align:center" | 2016
|style="text-align:center;"|
| 12 || 7 || 3 || 3 || 53 || 41 || 94 || 27 || 14 || 0.43 || 0.43 || 7.57 || 5.86 || 13.43 || 3.86 || 2
|- style="background-color: #EAEAEA"
! scope="row" style="text-align:center" | 2017
|style="text-align:center;"|
| 12 || 7 || 7 || 1 || 77 || 39 || 116 || 31 || 21 || 1 || 0.14 || 11 || 5.57 || 16.57 || 4.43 || 3
|- style="background-color: #EAEAEA"
! colspan=3| Career
! 25 
! 15 
! 13 
! 206 
! 142 
! 348 
! 82 
! 61 
! 0.63 
! 0.46 
! 8.49 
! 5.69 
! 14.18 
! 3.49 
! 2.45
|}

References

External links

1993 births
Living people
Carlton Football Club players
Swan Districts Football Club players
Preston Football Club (VFA) players
Australian rules footballers from Western Australia
People from Port Hedland, Western Australia
Australian people of Dutch descent
Australian people of Indian descent
East Fremantle Football Club players